The Force India VJM09 is a Formula One racing car designed by Force India to compete in the 2016 Formula One season. The car was driven by Le Mans winner Nico Hülkenberg and Sergio Pérez, and used the Mercedes PU106C Hybrid power unit.

The VJM09 scored a notable podium at the Monaco Grand Prix where Pérez finished third and Hülkenberg sixth. It was the first time the team had scored a podium at Monaco in any guise (i.e. Jordan, Midland, Spyker or Force India). Pérez finished third again two races later in Baku at the European Grand Prix. At the Belgian Grand Prix the team managed to get their first double-finish within the top-five since the 2014 Bahrain Grand Prix with Hülkenberg finishing fourth and Pérez finishing in fifth. As a result, the team took fourth place in the Constructors' Championship from Williams, their highest ever finishing position in the team's history.

Complete Formula One results
(key) (results in bold indicate pole position; results in italics indicate fastest lap)

† Driver failed to finish the race, but was classified as they had completed greater than 90% of the race distance.

References

External links

Force India Formula One cars
2016 Formula One season cars